Lingda is a village in Anand district in the Indian state of Gujarat. It is located in Umreth Taluka on the Nadiad-Dakor road. The name was derived from the temple of Lord Shiva, named લીંગડા (Shree Siddhanath Mahadev).

Geography
It is 4 km from the town of Umreth (The Silk Nagari), 11 kilometers from Dakor (Temple of Lord Krisna), 19 km from NH-8 and from Anand (The Milk City) and 22 km from Nadiad.

Fifteen ponds surround the village and are used for agriculture. The main canal is Mahi Sichai and many sub canals divert water to cover more than 75% of agricultural land. The water in the land is 10 to 20 feet.

Notes and references

Villages in Anand district